Thomas Burgh (died 1810) was an Irish politician who was elected to the Irish House of Commons to represent Kilbeggan (1790–98), Clogher (1798–1800) and Fore (1800).

Burgh was educated at Trinity College, Dublin.

Burgh represented the constituencies of Kilbeggan (1790–1798), Clogher (1798–1800) and Fore (1800).

References

1810 deaths
Irish MPs 1790–1797
Irish MPs 1798–1800
Members of the Parliament of Ireland (pre-1801) for County Tyrone constituencies
Members of the Parliament of Ireland (pre-1801) for County Westmeath constituencies
Alumni of Trinity College Dublin